Stoneleigh, also known as the  Charles E. Ward House or Ruffner Payne House, is a historic home located at Charleston, West Virginia.  It was built in 1917 as the residence of Charles E. Ward, a leading West Virginia industrialist.

It was listed on the National Register of Historic Places in 1984 as part of the South Hills Multiple Resource Area.

References

Houses in Charleston, West Virginia
Houses completed in 1917
Houses on the National Register of Historic Places in West Virginia
National Register of Historic Places in Charleston, West Virginia
Tudor Revival architecture in West Virginia